Donovan Hohn (born May 29, 1972 San Francisco) is an American author, essayist, and editor.

Life
Donovan Hohn is the author of Moby-Duck: The True Story of 28,800 Bath Toys Lost at Sea and of the Beachcombers, Oceanographers, Environmentalists, and Fools, Including the Author, Who Went in Search of Them, the tale of the Friendly Floatees. He was raised in San Francisco. He graduated from Oberlin College, from Boston University with an MA, and from University of Michigan, with an MFA.

A former English teacher, and a former senior editor of Harper's Magazine, he was also the features editor of GQ. His work has appeared in Harper’s Magazine, The New York Times Magazine, Outside, and The Best Creative Nonfiction, Vol. 2.

Awards
 2013 Knight-Wallace Fellowship in Journalism
 2013 PEN/John Kenneth Galbraith Award (runner-up) in General nonfiction
 2010 National Endowment for the Arts Creative Writing Fellowship
 2008 Whiting Award
 2004 Hopwood Award for Essay
 2003 Hopwood Award for Poetry

Works

Books
''Moby-Duck: The True Story of 28,800 Bath Toys Lost at Sea and of the Beachcombers, Oceanographers, Environmentalists, and Fools, Including the Author, Who Went in Search of Them' '(2011)

Essays
"A Romance of Rust", Harper's (January 2005)
"Moby-Duck", Harper's (January 2007)
"Falling", Harper's (April 2008)

"Monsterwellen", Outside Magazine (Jan. 2009)

References

External links

Profile at The Whiting Foundation
New York Times review of Moby-Duck
Interview on The New Yorker's "Book Bench"
Interview on NPR's "Fresh Air"
"Back story," Gawker

American essayists
Oberlin College alumni
Boston University alumni
University of Michigan alumni
Writers from San Francisco
Living people
1972 births